Asnières-la-Giraud is a commune in the Charente-Maritime department in the Nouvelle-Aquitaine region of south-western France.

The inhabitants of the commune are known as Asnierois or Asnieroises.

Geography
Asnières-la-Giraud is located some 38 km east of Rochefort and 7 km south of Saint-Jean-d'Angély. Access to the commune is by the D150 road from Saint-Jean-d'Angély in the north which passes through the west of the commune and the village and continues to Saint-Hilaire-de-Villefranche. The D120 road from Saint-Jean-d'Angély passes through the east of the commune and continues to Sainte-Même. The D217 road connects the D120 and the D150 in the commune and continues west to Mazeray. Apart from the village there are the hamlets of La Touzetterie on the north-eastern border, Moulin de la Laigne, La Laigne, Le Plonget, La Giraud, La Rue d'Asnières, Le Puits d'Asnières, Champmiaud, and La Tranche in the south. There are some patches of forest but most of the commune is farmland.

The Loubat river flows south through the commune west of the D150 and through the village before continuing south.

Geologically it is a limestone plateau of the Tithonian period (formerly called Portlandian)

Neighbouring communes and villages

Administration

List of Successive Mayors

Budget and Taxation
The Taxation rates are: 6.28% for housing tax, 11.80% for developed land, 37% for undeveloped land, and 8% business tax. As the community of communes also levies all four taxes: respectively 2.46%, 5.50%, 11.91%, and 3.82%, this gives a total, before the department and the region, of: 8.74% for housing tax, 17.30% for developed land, 48.91% for undeveloped land, and 11.82% business tax (2007 figures).

Demography
In 2017 the commune had 1,050 inhabitants.

Distribution of Age Groups
The population of the town is younger than the departmental average.

Percentage Distribution of Age Groups in Asnières-la-Giraud and Charente-Maritime Department in 2017

Source: INSEE

Economy
Asnières-la-Giraud has always been an agricultural and viticultural; commune. Nevertheless, there are many trades in the commune: a garage, a mechanically construction business, an Emmaus warehouse, and activities linked to tourism with a hotel, a rural cottage, and a Youth Hostel called Chantageasse. The vineyards are in the Appellation d'origine contrôlée (AOC) region of Cognac: the Fins Bois cru.

Culture and heritage

Civil heritage
 The Fontaines d'Asnières milk factory at 17 Rue de la Laiterie is registered as a historical monument.
 An old well

Religious heritage
 The Church of Saint Medard

Notable people linked to the commune
 Auguste Roy de Loulay, French politician born on 26 August 1818 at Asnières-la-Giraud.

See also
 Communes of the Charente-Maritime department

References

External links

 Asnières-la-Giraud on Géoportail, National Geographic Institute (IGN) website 
 Annieres on the 1750 Cassini Map

Communes of Charente-Maritime